Founded in 1904, the Association of Chartered Certified Accountants (ACCA) is the global professional accounting body offering the Chartered Certified Accountant qualification (ACCA). It has 240,952 members and 541,930 future members worldwide. ACCA's headquarters are in London with principal administrative office in Glasgow. ACCA works through a network of over 110 offices and centres in 51 countries - with 346 Approved Learning Partners (ALP) and more than 7,600 Approved Employers worldwide, who provide employee development. 

The term 'Chartered' in ACCA qualification refers to the Royal Charter granted in 1974.

'Chartered Certified Accountant' is a legally protected term. Individuals who describe themselves as Chartered Certified Accountants must be members of ACCA and if they carry out public practice engagements, must comply with additional regulations such as holding a practising certificate, carrying liability insurance and submitting to inspections.

The Association of Authorised Public Accountants (AAPA), one of the British professional bodies for public accountants, has been a subsidiary of ACCA since 1996.

ACCA works in the public interest, ensuring that its members are appropriately regulated. It promotes principles-based regulation. ACCA actively seeks to enhance the value of accounting in society through international research. It takes progressive stances on global issues to ensure accountancy as a profession continues to grow in reputation and influence.

History
ACCA traces its origin to 1904, when eight people formed the London Association of Accountants to allow more open access to the profession than was available through the accounting bodies at the time, notably the Institute of Chartered Accountants in England and Wales (ICAEW) and the Institute of Chartered Accountants of Scotland (ICAS). As of 2020, the vision of ACCA is to develop the accountancy profession the world needs.

Key dates in ACCA history include:

 1909: Ethel Ayres Purdie is elected as the first female associate member of an accounting professional body.
 1917: London Association of Accountants is the first UK professional body to examine tax.
 1930: London Association of Accountants successfully campaigned for the right to audit companies.
 1933: London Association of Accountants renamed to London Association of Certified Accountants.
 1939: Corporation of Accountants (Scottish body, founded 1891) merged with London Association of Certified Accountants to become the Association of Certified and Corporate Accountants.
 1941: Institution of Certified Public Accountants (founded 1903, and incorporating the Central Association of Accountants from 1933) merged with Association of Certified and Corporate Accountants.
 1971: Association of Certified and Corporate Accountants renamed Association of Certified Accountants.
 1974: Royal Charter granted by Queen Elizabeth II.
 1974: ACCA became one of six founding members of the Consultative Committee of Accountancy Bodies (CCAB).
 1977: ACCA became a founding member of the International Federation of Accountants (IFAC).
 1984: Association of Certified Accountants renamed to Chartered Association of Certified Accountants.
 1995: ACCA members voted at an extraordinary general meeting to rename itself Association of Chartered Public Accountants and to introduce the designation Chartered Public Accountant. The Privy Council subsequently rejected this proposal over concerns about the term 'public'. It did however agree that any accountancy body bearing a royal charter could use 'chartered' as part of its designation.
 1996: Chartered Association of Certified Accountants renamed to Association of Chartered Certified Accountants. Members are entitled to use the title Chartered Certified Accountant (Designatory letters ACCA or FCCA). The Association of Authorised Public Accountants (AAPA) became a subsidiary of ACCA. The organisation earned its first Queen's Award, for Export Achievement.
 1998: ACCA's syllabus formed the basis of the United Nations' global accountancy curriculum titled Guideline on National Requirements for the Qualification of Professional Accountants, published in 1999. ACCA was a participant in the consultative group that devised this global Benchmark.
 2001: ACCA received a Queen's Award for Enterprise: International Trade, recognising ACCA's growth and its role in 160 countries worldwide.
 2002: ACCA received its second Queen's Award for Enterprise in the space of 12 months, in the Sustainable Development category. The award recognized ACCA's continuing work on social and environmental issues.
 2009: ACCA members allowed to provide probate services as of 1 August under Probate Services (Approved Bodies) Order 2009 Number 1588.
 2011 onward: ACCA is the first accountancy body to publish an integrated annual report.
 2014: ACCA members and student numbers reached 600,000 worldwide.
 2015: ACCA launched MSc in Professional Accountancy with the University of London.
2016: ACCA formed a strategic alliance with Chartered Accountants Australia and New Zealand (CA ANZ).
2017: ACCA reached over 700,000 members and students worldwide, with 208,000 fully qualified members and 503,000 students in 178 countries.
2018: ACCA introduced Strategic Professional – a new level of the ACCA Qualification.
2020: ACCA announces its commitments to the UN Sustainable Development Goals

Qualifications

The term Chartered Certified Accountant was introduced in 1996. Prior to that date, ACCA members were known as Certified Accountant.  It is still permissible for an ACCA member to use this term. Members of ACCA with post-qualification experience of more than five years and have completed the required continued professional development are designated Fellows, and use the designatory letters FCCA in place of ACCA.

The term Chartered refers to the Royal Charter granted by Her Majesty Queen Elizabeth II of the United Kingdom.

Chartered Certified Accountants work in all fields of business and finance. Some are engaged in public practice work, others work in the private sector and some are employed by government bodies.

Since Chartered Certified Accountant is a legally protected term, individuals who describe themselves as such must be members of ACCA. If they carry out public practice engagements, they must comply with additional regulations such as holding a practising certificate, being insured against any possible liability claims and submitting to inspections.

ACCA offers the following certifications:

Chartered Certified Accountant (ACCA) 
Chartered Certified Accountant is the professional body's main qualification. Following completion of up to 13 professional examinations, three years of supervised, relevant accounting experience and an ethics module, it enables an individual to become a Chartered Certified Accountant. The ACCA professional examinations are offered worldwide four times yearly in March, June, September and December as paper-based and computer-based exams. On-demand computer-based exams (CBE) are also offered for the first four exams (BT, MA, FA, LW), and Session CBEs for the rest (PM, TX, FR, AA, FM) which are available to be taken at ACCA licensed exam centres. A Bachelor of Science (Honours) degree in Applied Accounting (after completing the Fundamentals level of the exams, the Ethics and Professional Skills module and submitting a Research and Analysis project), is offered in association with Oxford Brookes University.

From September 2018 onward, the syllabus comprises 13 examinations and an Ethics and Professional Skills module (EPSM), although some exemptions are available. In April 2019, a Data Analytics unit was added in EPSM .

The qualification is structured in three modules, plus an Ethics and Professional Skills module and a Professional Experience Requirement (PER).

The Applied Knowledge level consists of 3 examinations:

 BT - Business and Technology
 MA - Management Accounting
 FA - Financial Accounting

The Applied Skills level consists of 6 examinations:

 LW - Corporate and Business Law
 PM - Performance Management
 TX - Taxation
 FR - Financial Reporting
 AA - Audit and Assurance
 FM - Financial Management

The Strategic Professional level involves 4 examinations: 2 from Essential and any 2 from Options.

Essential (or Compulsory):

 SBL - Strategic Business Leader
 SBR - Strategic Business Reporting

Options:

 AFM - Advanced Financial Management
 APM - Advanced Performance Management
 ATX - Advanced Taxation
 AAA  - Advanced Audit and Assurance

The ACCA full Professional qualification is regarded as the equivalent of a UK master's degree by the UK NARIC and Department for Education.

Subjects include: Financial accounting, Management accounting, Financial reporting, Taxation, Company law, Audit and assurance and Financial management.

Foundation-level qualifications - Foundations in Accountancy (FIA) 

ACCA offers a range of foundation-level certificates and diplomas - collectively referred to as Foundations in Accountancy (FIA) - which provide an entry point for anyone new to accounting and finance and who doesn't meet the minimum entry requirements for the ACCA Qualification (which is three GCSEs and 2 A Levels or equivalent, in five separate subjects). Students can start at any level within the Foundation level, but it is recommended that students without any formal academic qualifications start with the Introductory Diploma in Financial and Management Accounting and complete exams Recording Financial Transactions (FA1) and Management Information (MA1); then progress to the Intermediate Diploma in Financial and Management Accounting and complete exams Maintaining Financial Records (FA2) and Managing Costs and Finance (MA2); before progressing to the Diploma in Accounting and Business and completing Business and Technology (FBT), Management Accounting (FMA) and Financial Accounting (FFA). Students can use the Foundation-level awards as an entry route onto the ACCA Qualification. Students who complete the Diploma in Accounting and Business will be given exemption from the first three exams of the ACCA Qualification (BT, MA and FA) and can start their studies on the ACCA Qualification with Corporate and Business Law (LW).

In order to achieve a certificate for the exams completed students must also complete a foundation ethics module called Foundations in Professionalism, but this only has to be completed once, even if a student wishes to achieve both certificates and the diploma.

The Foundation-level exams are available as paper-based exams held in March, June, September and December or as on-demand computer-based exams throughout the year at ACCA licensed exam centres.

Other qualifications
The ACCA also offers certain other qualifications:

 BSc (Hons) in Applied Accounting, offered in association with Oxford Brookes University.
MSc in Professional Accountancy, offered in association with the University of London.
 Global MBA (for full ACCA members), offered in association with Oxford Brookes University.
 Certificate in International Financial Reporting (Cert IFR), offered both in English and Spanish.
 Diploma in International Financial Reporting (DipIFR), offered both in English and Russian.
 Certificate in International Auditing (Cert IA), offered both in English and Spanish.
 Certificate in International Public Sector Accounting Standards (Cert IPSAS), offered both in English and Arabic.
 Certificate in Business Valuations in partnership with the French Chartered Accountants Institute (CSOEC), offered both in English and French.
 Diploma in Financial Management (DipFM). This certification was previously known as the Certified Diploma in Accounting and Finance (CDipAF), a financial qualification designed for managers outside of finance. This qualification was replaced with Foundations in Accountancy awards at the end of 2011.

Disciplinary proceedings 
ACCA students, affiliates and members are bound by ACCA rules and regulations. ACCA is able to take disciplinary action (such as revoking ACCA qualification or exacting a fine) against them if they breach ACCA rules. ACCA rules and regulations are governed by English and Welsh law and ACCA disciplinary decisions can only be challenged in England and Wales.

ACCA-X online courses 

Launched in early 2015, ACCA-X are online courses for students starting their studies in accountancy and business. These courses are available for the first seven Foundations level exams and hosted on edX, with content developed by Epigeum.

In April 2016, ACCA-X won the Best eLearning and Online Education Award at the International and European Association Awards held in Berlin, Germany.

Free courses 
The following courses are free and available to anyone in the world:

 Introduction to Financial and Management Accounting (preparation for FA1 and MA1)
 Intermediate Financial and Management Accounting (preparation for FA2 and MA2)

Paid courses 
These courses are available in all but three countries:

 Business and Technology (preparation for BT/FBT)
 Management Accounting (preparation for MA/FMA)
 Financial Management (preparation for FA/FFA)

Exams passed in these three modules and the completion of 'Foundations in Professionalism' module will lead to the Diploma in Accounting and Business.

Memberships

Affiliate
Candidates register as student members to undertake the professional qualification.

Upon successful completion of the examinations, student members transfer to Affiliate status.

"For ACCA affiliates to gain admission to full membership, they must demonstrate, on the application form, that they have obtained a minimum of three years of acceptable, supervised, practical experience in an accountancy role (or roles) and have reached the required standard of competence."

Fellowship
From 2008, Fellowship, or senior membership of ACCA, is awarded automatically based on 5 years' continuous membership, subject to compliance with Continuing Professional Development requirements. This practice is different to many other accounting bodies whose members may attain senior memberships only after demonstrating outstanding achievement or contribution made to the accounting profession or at large.

Fellow members of ACCA use the designatory letters FCCA in place of ACCA.

Continuing Professional Development
Before 2005, Continuing Professional Development (CPD) was mandatory only for holders of 'Practicing Certificate' and 'Insolvency Licence'. From 2005 to 2007, ACCA phased in mandatory CPD requirements for all members.

Legal and mutual recognition

Europe

United Kingdom and Ireland
The ACCA or Chartered Certified Accountant qualification is fully recognised in both the United Kingdom and Ireland.

 Under its Charter, ACCA works in the public interest.
 It is a Designated Professional Body under the Financial Services and Markets Act, business activities.
 It is a Recognised Professional Body under the Insolvency Act to issue permits to individual Chartered Certified Accountants to conduct insolvency appointments.
 It is also a Recognised Qualifying Body and Recognised Supervisory Body in relation to company auditing under the Companies Act of 1989.
 ACCA is a member of the Consultative Committee of Accountancy Bodies (CCAB). Members of these bodies are deemed to hold equivalent-level qualifications and advertisements for jobs often state that an organisation is looking for a CCAB-qualified individual.
 Full members of CCAB organisations including ACCA could apply for ICAEW membership subject to certain criteria.
 Only ACCA, ICAEW, ICAS, Association of International Accountants (AIA) and Chartered Accountants Ireland (CA Ireland) are able to authorise members to conduct audit, insolvency and investment business work in both the United Kingdom and Ireland.
 Outside these countries, legal recognition by government authorities and mutual recognition by equivalent overseas institutes, varies. Where full legal or mutual recognition is not available, ACCA members can sometimes obtain advanced standing in terms of sitting local accountancy examinations. ACCA's strong global reputation may make it unnecessary to acquire a local designation.
 Similarly, many universities and educational providers recognise ACCA as equivalent to at least a Bachelor's degree in accountancy, for the purpose of obtaining credit towards a local master's degree or an advanced study program.

The Quality and Qualifications Ireland (QQI) assigned ACCA Qualification to 'Level 8' of the Irish National Framework of Qualifications (NFQ) in 2018. Level 8 holds Irish postgraduate qualifications, such as postgraduate diplomas and master's degrees.

In 2011, the Financial Reporting Council (FRC; then Professional Oversight Board) published information for the first time about its concerns over self-regulation by particular institutes. Press reports highlighted comments about ACCA, which had implemented recommendations to improve its examination syllabus, but needed to pay greater attention to monitoring long-time members. In 2011, 2012 and 2013 the ACCA professional body had the highest percentage of A&B (best) outcomes from FRC's Recognised Supervisory Body (RSB) visits to a sample of 'Registered UK Audit Firms'. ACCA firms tend to audit smaller and less complex clients.

At the end of 2016 there were over 88,000 members and 90,000 students in the UK & Ireland.

European Union (EU), European Economic Area (EEA) & Switzerland
The ACCA qualification is legally recognized by all member countries of the European Union under the Mutual Recognition Directive. This recognition extends to the European Economic Area nations and Switzerland. For example, a holder of the ACCA could practice as an accountant in all member countries of the European Union, European Economic Area and Switzerland, describing himself/herself as ACCA or Chartered Certified Accountant. Access to local professional qualifications requires a separate test.

At the end of 2016 there were over 16,000 members and almost 60,000 students in Europe (excluding the UK & Ireland).

Turkey
ACCA and the Union of Chambers of Certified Public Accountants of Turkey (TÜRMOB) signed a partnership agreement in 2004 which enables TÜRMOB members resident in Turkey to follow the ACCA Strategic Professional level and achieve ACCA membership.

North America
United States

 In June 2012, ACCA and Institute of Management Accountants (IMA) announced a strategic partnership. The two bodies joined forces to empower accountants and financial professionals to drive business performance. In January 2013, the ICMA Board of Regents, representing the certification division of IMA, voted to waive its usual bachelor's degree requirement for ACCA members wishing to earn IMA's Certified Management Accountant (CMA) credential. The bachelor's degree waiver will allow all ACCA members around the world, regardless of background, access to IMA's CMA credential. This is a benefit to ACCA members who wish to have a US-based credential.
 There is no mutual recognition between ACCA and the American Institute of Certified Public Accountants (AICPA)/National Association of State Boards of Accountancy (NASBA).

At the end of 2016 there were 2,015 members in the US.

Canada
ACCA announced a Mutual Recognition Agreement with Certified General Accountant (CGA Canada) effective from 1 January 2007; renewed in 2011 for a further 5 years period until December 2017. , Canadian Institute of Chartered Accountants (CICA), World Education Services and the Odette School of Business at the University of Windsor indicated that the evaluation recognized ACCA as having the Canadian equivalence of a bachelor's degree (four years) in Accounting. The Canadian branch of ACCA is pursuing recognition for statutory audit purposes in the province of Ontario under the province's Public Accounting Act of 2004.''

Canadian Institute of Chartered Accountants and Certified Management Accountants of Canada (CMA Canada) announced a joint qualification 'Chartered Professional Accountant or CPA Designation', but whether this designation will impinge on ACCA's application for recognition in Ontario is uncertain.

On November 29, 2012, the ACCA opened up legal proceedings against the CICA to operate in Canada, complicated by the merger of the accounting profession in Canada, incorporating CICA, CMA Canada and CGA to use 'Chartered Professional Accountant (CPA)'. A 10-year transitional period  requires all CPA members to use CPA, 'legacy designation' rather than the newer designation. The merger completed in 2015.

At the end of 2016 there were 3,011 members in Canada.

Oceania

Australia
ACCA has an office in Sydney and holds exams in major cities including Sydney, Melbourne, Perth, Adelaide and Brisbane.

ACCA members are not eligible to be registered company auditors as of right.CPA Australia and Institute of Public Accountants recognise ACCA qualification as sufficient to obtain a skill assessment as an Accountant for the purposes of immigration. The Tax Practitioners Board accredited ACCA as a recognised tax agent association and as a recognised BAS agent association on 12 May 2010.

Subject to passing exams in Australian tax and law, ACCA members may obtain the equivalent level of membership from the Institute of Public Accountants.

CA ANZ Strategic Alliance 
In June 2016, the Association of Chartered Certified Accountants (ACCA) and Chartered Accountants Australia and New Zealand (CA ANZ), announced a strategic alliance. ACCA members do not qualify to become a full member of CA ANZ, additional requirements relating to residency and membership length must be satisfied before CA ANZ membership may be granted.

At the end of 2016 there were 3,414 members and 1,721 students in Australia.

New Zealand
ACCA member, affiliate and student activities in New Zealand are managed by its office in Australia, supported by Network Panel members based in Auckland and Wellington as well as member advocates based in Christchurch.

With the merger of Institute of Chartered Accountants Australia (ICAA) and the New Zealand Institute of Chartered Accountants in December 2014, the newly created 'Chartered Accountants Australia and New Zealand (CA ANZ)' became the sole national accountancy body in New Zealand, which is in a strategic alliance with the ACCA.

At the end of 2016 there were 502 members in New Zealand.

Caribbean, Central and South America
The ACCA is an affiliate of the Institute of Chartered Accountants of the Caribbean. The ACCA qualification is legally recognized in the French Guiana (Part of France and hence subject to European Union regulations).

At the end of 2016 there were 4,857 members and 16,000 students in the Caribbean.

Africa

Kenya
ACCA is recognised in Kenya and has an office in the country. Some universities offer ACCA.

Namibia
ACCA was awarded full and unconditional accreditation status as a professional body in Namibia by the statutory Public Accountants' and Auditors' Board (PAAB) on 24 November 2016. The PAAB is a statutory body established to oversee the profession and maintain a register of persons entitled to work or practise as public accountants or public auditors in Namibia.

South Africa
Although ACCA holds recognition for statutory tax purposes, it has no agreement with any accountancy body in South Africa, while ICAEW, ICAS and CA Ireland have agreements with South African Institute of Chartered Accountants.

Zimbabwe
ACCA Zimbabwe is one of the constituent bodies of the Public Accountants and Auditors Board (PAAB). The PAAB is a statutory body established in 1996 to oversee the profession and maintain a register of persons entitled to work or practise as public accountants or public auditors in Zimbabwe. Only ACCA members in good standing and Institute of Chartered Accountants of Zimbabwe can register as auditors.

Asia

China
ACCA entered China in late 1980s, and has developed its China base rapidly in recent years. It has entered into agreements with 41 Chinese Universities, many of which are leading in the disciplines of finance and accounting as well as having excellent academic reputations in a wider range of subjects. The most well known institutions include Tsinghua University, Xiamen University, Central University of Finance and Economics, Shanghai University of Finance and Economics, Southwestern University of Finance and Economics, Xi'an Jiaotong University and Sun Yat-Sen University.

As of early 2019, ACCA had 25,000 members and 108,000 students in China, with 11 offices in Beijing, Changsha, Shanghai, Chengdu, Guangzhou, Shenzhen, Shenyang, Qingdao, Wuhan, Hong Kong SAR, and Macau SAR.

Hong Kong
An Agreement of Recognition Arrangement (ARA) between ACCA and Hong Kong Institute of Certified Public Accountants (HKICPA; local statutory accountancy body) was put in place on 22 August 2006, backdated to 1 July 2005. This was less flexible than the previous rule.

The old agreement was terminated on 30 June 2005 forcing ACCA members to accept the so-called "8 unfair terms" e.g., hold a degree recognised by HKICPA, work under HKICPA authorised employers, attend workshops and pass HKICPA's Final Professional Examination (FPE), etc.

This notwithstanding, HKICPA members could join in ACCA without any further requirement.

The ACCA qualification is highly accepted by the Hong Kong employment market. Most HKICPA members qualified through a joint scheme with Hong Kong Society of Accountants (HKSA) which operated for more than 20 years. HKSA later became HKICPA.

At the end of 2016 there were 18,238 members and over 8,000 students in Hong Kong.

India
UK qualified students are eligible for exemptions in the following papers of the CMA qualification (2012 syllabus) offered by The Institute of Cost Accountants of India:

Foundation: Complete exemption.

Intermediate:

Paper 5- Financial Accounting

Paper 6 - Laws, Ethics & Governance

Paper 8-Cost Accounting and Financial Management

Paper 10- Cost and Management Accountancy

Paper 12- Company Accounts and Audit

Final:

Paper 14- Advanced Financial Management

Paper 15- Business Strategy and Strategic Cost Management

Paper 17- Strategic Performance Management

Paper 18- Corporate Financial Reporting

Paper 20- Financial Analysis and Business Valuation

In 2021, ACCA India organized a nationwide 'Financial Literacy Drive' for children. The programme was delivered with the help of ACCA members in India

Macau
ACCA currently is legally recognised with the joint scheme relationships by Macau Society of Certified Practising Accountants (local statutory accountancy body) in Macau.

Malaysia
On 13 August 2007, ACCA and the Malaysian Institute of Certified Public Accountants (MICPA) signed an MRA that provided a route for members to join the other body. The ACCA or Chartered Certified Accountant qualification, along with 10 other professional accounting qualifications, is recognised by the Malaysian Institute of Accountants (MIA). MIA also recognises 21 Malaysian university qualifications as a prerequisite for registration as a chartered accountant in Malaysia. Only MIA members qualify as accountants in Malaysia under the Accountants Act, 1967.

ACCA is statutorily recognised in Part II of the First Schedule of the Accountants Act, 1967.

At the end of 2016 there were 12,521 members and 42,000 students in Malaysia.

Nepal 
From 2014, Tribhuwan University has recognized ACCA (after full membership) as equivalent to bachelor's degree if pursued after intermediate level.

Pakistan
The ACCA qualification confers the Qualified Company Secretary designation in Pakistan. ACCA and the local statutory accounting body Institute of Chartered Accountants of Pakistan (ICAP) offer partial recognition of each other.

The Higher Education Commission (HEC) of Pakistan recognises ACCA members qualifications as equal to master's degree in Commerce (MCom). ICAP also awards some exemptions to ACCA affiliates.

On 4 December 2014, ACCA and ICMAP (Institute of Cost and Management Accountants of Pakistan) signed an MOU to enhance the existing academic recognition arrangements between the two accounting bodies. This MoU shall facilitate students and members of ACCA and ICMA Pakistan to earn dual qualification and membership on a fast track basis.

At the end of 2016, there were 3,843 members and over 37,000 students in Pakistan.

Singapore
In Singapore, holders of ACCA had until 31 December 2016 and existing students have until 31 December 2018 to complete the ICPAS PAC and qualify for the Chartered Accountant of Singapore professional designation through the previous transitional arrangements.

Taiwan
According to rules 6(iii) & 9 of accountancy examination published by Taiwan government, ACCA members are entitled to obtain advanced standing in the examinations to become a Certified Public Accountant in Taiwan.

United Arab Emirates
In March 2014, ACCA signed a strategic partnership agreement with UAE's national accountancy body Accountants and Auditors Association (AAA) to help the latter develop a new Chartered Accountant qualification nationwide. The exams will be held jointly, and successful graduates will gain both ACCA and UAE's new Chartered Accountants' qualifications - the UAECA (United Arab Emirates Chartered Accountant).

Skyline University College is the first ACCA Gold Approved Learning institute in the UAE.

Global qualification partnerships
Through partnerships with professional institutions, ACCA offers students and members access to other related qualifications.

Academic qualifications 
 BSc (Hons) in Applied Accounting, with Oxford Brookes University
 MSc in Professional Accountancy, with the University of London
 Global MBA, with Oxford Brookes University (accelerated for ACCA) 
 Public Policy and Management offering from SOAS, the University of London

Professional qualifications and other accreditations 

 Advanced Diploma in International Taxation (ADIT) with the Chartered Institute of Taxation (CIOT)
 CMA (Certified Management Accountant) program with Institute of Management Accountants (IMA)
 Certificate in Treasury (CertT) qualification with Association of Corporate Treasurers (ACT) 
 Membership of the Chartered Institute for Securities and Investment (CISI)
 Chartered Manager Award with Chartered Management Institute (CMI)
 Certified Internal Auditor (CIA) certification with the Institute of Internal Auditors (IIA)
 Chartered Tax Adviser (CTA) qualification with the Chartered Institute of Taxation (CIOT) (UK only)
 Chartered Institute for Securities & Investment (CISI) Management (Pakistan only)
 Certified Fraud Examiner with Association of Certified Fraud Examiners (ACFE) in USA
 The Institute of Cost Accountants of India (ICoAI)

Representation worldwide 
ACCA is represented on many committees and bodies around the world, including the following:

 Accountancy Europe (formerly FEE)
 Africa Capacity Building Foundation
 ASEAN Federation of Accountants (AFA)
 Confederation of Asian and Pacific Accountants (CAPA)
 Consultative Committee of Accountancy Bodies (CCAB)
 Eastern, Central and Southern African Federation of Accountants (ECSAFA)
 European Association of Craft, Small and Medium-Sized Enterprises (UEAPME)
 European Financial Reporting Advisory Group
 Fédération des Experts Comptables Méditerranéens (FCM)
 Global Reporting Initiative (GRI)
 IFAC Board
 IFAC International Auditing and Assurance Standards Board (IAASB)
 IFAC International Public Sector Accounting Board
 IFAC Professional Accountants in Business Committee
 IFAC Small and Medium-Sized Practices Committee
 Institute of Chartered Accountants of the Caribbean (ICAC)
 Inter-American Accounting Association (IAA)
 International Federation of Accountants (IFAC)
 International Integrated Reporting Committee (IIRC)
 Organisation for Economic Co-operation and Development (OECD)
 Pan African Federation of Accountants (PAFA)
 Professional Accountancy Organization Development Committee (PAODC)
 South Eastern European Partnership on Accountancy Development (SEEPAD)
 The Conference Board Europe

See also
 Association of Authorised Public Accountants (AAPA - Subsidiary of ACCA)
 Certified Accounting Technician (CAT)
 Chartered Certified Accountant (ACCA/FCCA)

References

External links
 
Key Facts and Trends in the Accountancy Profession, annual publication by the Financial Reporting Council (FRC)

Accounting in the United Kingdom
Organisations based in the City of Westminster
Organisations based in Glasgow
Chartered Certified Accountants
1904 establishments in the United Kingdom
Member bodies of the International Federation of Accountants